Center Township, population 7,464, is one of thirteen townships in Chatham County, North Carolina. Center Township contains the town of Pittsboro within it.

Geography
The Haw River forms the eastern boundary of Center Township.  Roberson Creek and Brooks Creek, both tributaries to the Haw River, drain the township in the north and center.  Roberson Creek has two tributaries, Turkey Creek and Hill Creek, of its own.  The southwest border is delineated by the Rocky River and it has one tributary, Harlands Creek.

References

Townships in Chatham County, North Carolina
Townships in North Carolina